Vineeth Suresh (born 19 April 1990) popularly known as Hemanth Menon by his stage name, is an Indian actor who predominantly works in Malayalam and Tamil movies.

Career
He made his debut in 2010 with the film Living Together. He has since performed in Doctor Love (2011), Ordinary (2012), Chattakkari, Chapters and Thomson Villa.

Filmography

References

External links
 
 

Indian male film actors
Male actors from Kerala
People from Malappuram district
Living people
21st-century Indian male actors
Male actors in Malayalam cinema
1989 births